Westminster Rovers F.C. was a Welsh football club based in Wrexham, Wales.

History
Formed sometime around 1889 as the team of the Westminster Colliery, Westminster Rovers were runners up in the Welsh Cup in 1892 and 1894, on both occasions losing to Chirk. They were also founding members of the Welsh Senior League, a competition which they won in 1894. They are last mentioned in 1897. The name reappeared in 1919, for one season in the Ffrith and District League.

Seasons

Cup History

Notable players
  Harry Trainer – Wales Football International.
  Job Wilding – Wales Football International.

Honours

League
Welsh Senior League
Winners (1): 1894
Runner Up (1): 1895

Cups
Welsh Cup
Runner Up (2): 1892, 1894

Denbighshire and Flintshire Charity Cup
Runner Up (1): 1897

References

Sources

Sport in Wrexham
Sport in Wrexham County Borough
Defunct football clubs in Wales
Football clubs in Wrexham
Mining association football teams in Wales
Association football clubs established in 1889
Association football clubs disestablished in 1897